22 Fillmore is a trolleybus line operated by the San Francisco Municipal Railway (Muni). It connects the Marina District to the Dogpatch in San Francisco.

Route description
The line operates mostly on Fillmore Street and 16th Street, using Hermann and Church Streets to transition between the two. A short segment near the northern end of the line runs one block west of Fillmore on Steiner. The outbound terminal is listed as Fillmore and Bay, although inbound buses continue further north, stopping at Jefferson before turning around and doubling back before running south to the Dogpatch.

The route operates 24 hours with less frequent Owl service overnight as part of the All Nighter network.

History

Streetcar service on the line started in July 1895, running from 16th and Folsom Streets to Fillmore and Broadway. Running further north required a means to traverse the steep 24.54% grade of Pacific Heights. Thus the line was uniquely equipped with a funicular-style mechanism between Broadway and Green whereby a descending streetcar would provide counterweight for an ascending car by coupling both to a shared cable. The Fillmore Street counterbalance opened the following month. This section limited frequency and scheduling on the entire route as it required two passing cars to meet up at the appropriate points for the mechanism to operate.

The funicular segment was replaced with shuttle buses in 1941, diverting from the route a block to the west to avoid the steep grade. Streetcar service along the whole line ended in the early hours of August 1, 1948. The route was changed slightly to use Hermann Street rather than Duboce Avenue to jog between Church Street and Fillmore Street.

By 2016, very few further changes had occurred to the routing since the first streetcars ran a century earlier. The eastern/southern terminus of the line was moved to the Dogpatch in January 2021.

References

External links

 22 Fillmore — via SFMTA

San Francisco Municipal Railway trolleybus routes
Railway lines opened in 1895
Railway lines closed in 1948
Defunct funicular railways in the United States